Thamimun Ansari is an Indian politician belonging to Manithaneya Jananayaga Katchi (MJK). He is also General Secretary of the party. He has contested and was elected as MLA of Nagapattinam in Tamil Nadu Legislative Assembly in 2016 as an All India Anna Dravida Munnetra Kazhagam candidate.

References

Living people
All India Anna Dravida Munnetra Kazhagam politicians
Year of birth missing (living people)
Tamil Nadu MLAs 2016–2021
Tamil Nadu politicians